Ronan Queiroz de Paula Afonso (born 29 August 1994 in Vitória), commonly known as Ronan, is a Brazilian footballer who plays as a left back.

Club career 
Ronan is a youth product of Fluminense. He made his full debut at 15 August 2013 against Corinthians.

On 17 June 2014 he was loaned to Polish Ekstraklasa club, Legia Warsaw.

References

External links
Ronan at ZeroZero

Living people
1994 births
Brazilian footballers
Brazilian expatriate footballers
Association football midfielders
Fluminense FC players
Legia Warsaw players
FC Porto B players
Tombense Futebol Clube players
Nova Iguaçu Futebol Clube players
Associação Desportiva Cabofriense players
Campeonato Brasileiro Série A players
Campeonato Brasileiro Série D players
Ekstraklasa players
Liga Portugal 2 players
Brazilian expatriate sportspeople in Portugal
Brazilian expatriate sportspeople in Poland
Expatriate footballers in Portugal
Expatriate footballers in Poland